The 340th "Idan" Armoured Division is an Israel Defense Forces reserve division.  It falls under the jurisdiction of the Central Regional Command and is located in Camp Nachshonim.  As of March 2016, it is commanded by Brigadier-general Avi Gil.

History
Formerly the 880th Division, it was founded in 1974, after the Yom Kippur War, as a reserve division. In 1982, during the First Lebanon War, the division, which included three armored brigades, remained in command reserve, and entered the eastern front during the Battle of Sultan Yacoub. In 2002, during Operation Defensive Shield, it was responsible for the military occupation of Jenin. In 2005 the unit was responsible for evacuating the northern Gaza Strip during the disengagement plan. Between 2005 and 2010, its commander was also the IDF's Chief Armor Officer (head of the Armored Corps), but in April 2010 these roles were separated. Also, in 2010, the division was awarded first place in the Ramatkal prize for distinguished reserve units. 

In 2014, the division underwent reorganization aimed at turning it from an armored division into a light, multi-front division that specializes in counter-terrorism and urban warfare.

Units

 340th "Idan" Division
 5th "Sharon" (Reserve) Infantry Brigade
 16th "Jerusalem" (Reserve) Infantry Brigade
 847th "Chariots of Steel" (Reserve) Armor Brigade
 900th "Kfir"/"Young Lions" Infantry Brigade
 807th Division Signal Battalion

References

Military units and formations established in 2005
Central Command (Israel)
Infantry of Israel
2005 establishments in Israel
Divisions of Israel